An all-star team is a group of people all having a high level of performance in their field.  Originating in sports, it has since drifted into vernacular and has been borrowed heavily by the entertainment industry.

Sports

"All-star" as a sports term refers to individual players named to an "all-star" roster or team representing the top performers (members of such a team were all stars from other teams) during and before the end of a season in a given sport, or to a list of top participants who played in individual sports such as golf and bowling. Events limited to such honorees are referred to as "all-star games" or events.

In American team sports the premier all-star games are the Major League Baseball All-Star Game, NBA All-Star Game (basketball), Pro Bowl (football), NHL All-Star Game (hockey), and MLS All-Star Game (soccer). Many all-star teams, such as collegiate "all-conference" and All-America squads, are recognitions of performance only, without the connotation of those selected ever being teammates in a game.  The closest college sports come to an "All-star" game is the annual Senior Bowl which pits the best senior College Football players in the country against one another.  These players generally go on to be drafted in the NFL Draft in April.

In gaelic games, the term "all-stars" refers to the GAA GPA All-Stars Awards. These awards involve picking a fantasy team consisting of the top players in each position in the various sports (Gaelic football, Ladies' Gaelic football, hurling, rounders and camogie).

Entertainment

Cinema
The term "all star" is also used in films, often used as a form of publicity gimmick to promote the cast of a movie in which a number of high-profile actors appear, sometimes merely in cameo roles. An archetype is the 1956 version of Around the World in 80 Days.

Television
Some reality television series have produced "all-star" editions featuring notable contestants from previous seasons, such as champions, contestants popular among viewers, and sometimes, notable contestants from international versions of the franchise. These can include entire seasons where the alumni compete against each other, or a spin-off competition with a different format.

Sometimes, all-star crossovers may be organized between contestants of multiple reality formats; the MTV series The Challenge was originally a competition spin-off of its reality shows The Real World and Road Rules, but later seasons began to increasingly include alumni from other popular reality series such as The Amazing Race, Big Brother, and Survivor.

Music
"All-stars" in music terms is referred to record labels or a music genre's top musical artists. An example of this includes the single "Pow 2011" by Lethal Bizzle in which all the featured artists are credited as "Grime All-Stars". Sometimes, labels organize such all-star sessions to release dedicated albums. Examples of this case are the collective This Mortal Coil under the 4AD label, or the Roadrunner United sessions by Roadrunner Records. The term is not equivalent to supergroup, which refers to a group made of already established musicians from other popular bands or with a successful solo career.

Comics

The All Star DC Comics was an imprint of ongoing American comic book titles published by DC Comics that ran from 2005 to 2008.  DC has published two titles under the All-Star banner, featuring Batman and Superman. The premise of the imprint was to partner DC Comics' top tier characters with the most popular and acclaimed writers and artists.

See also
 Ensemble cast

References

External links
 

Sports terminology
Film and video terminology
Musical terminology